Goddard is a surname of Norman origin, found in England and France. It is derived from the personal name "Golhard". Recorded variants include Godard and Godart in England; Goudard and Godar in France; Gotthard, Godehard and Goddert in Germany; and Goedhard and Goedhart in Holland.

Notable people with the name include:

Arts and entertainment

Film, television, and theater
 Alf Goddard (1897–1981), English film actor
 Andy Goddard (born 1968), British film director and screenwriter
 Charles W. Goddard (1879–1951), American playwright and screenwriter
 Drew Goddard (born 1975), American screenwriter, director and producer
 Jim Goddard (1936–2013), English film and television director
 Liza Goddard (born 1950), British television presenter
 Paulette Goddard (1911–1990), American actress
 Trisha Goddard (born 1957), British television presenter

Literature and journalism

 Julia Goddard (1825–1896), British children's writer and animal welfare campaigner
 Mary Katharine Goddard (1738–1816), American publisher and printer
 Robert Goddard (novelist) (born 1954), British novelist
 Sarah Updike Goddard (c. 1701–1770), American publisher and printer
 William Goddard (publisher) (1740–1817), American publisher and printer

Music
 Adam Ant (born Stuart Leslie Goddard, 1954), British pop singer
 Alexa Goddard (born 1988), British R&B singer
 Geoff Goddard (1938–2000), English musician and songwriter
 George 'Sonny' Goddard (1924–1988), Trinidadian steelpan enthusiast and President of the Steelband Association
 Joe Goddard (born 1979), British indie musician (Hot Chip) and composer

Other arts and entertainment
Anna-Marie Goddard (born 1970), Dutch-born model for adult publications
Gary Goddard, American film producer and director; theme park designer
George William Goddard (1889–1987), American air force general and aerial photography pioneer

Politics and law
 Ambrose Goddard (c. 1727–1815), MP for Wiltshire
Ambrose Goddard (born 1819) (1819–1898), MP for Cricklade
Daniel Ford Goddard (1850–1922), MP for Ipswich
 F. Norton Goddard, New York City Republican politician, c. 1900
 Rayner Goddard, Baron Goddard (1877–1971), Lord Chief Justice of England and Wales
 Robert Hale Ives Goddard (1837–1916), industrialist and Rhode Island politician
 Samuel Pearson Goddard Jr. (1919–2006), 12th Governor of Arizona
 Theodore Goddard (1879–1952), British solicitor to Wallis Simpson during the Edward VIII abdication crisis
 Thomas Goddard (jurist) (1937–2019), New Zealand jurist
 Thomas Goddard (MP) (1777–1814), MP for Cricklade

Science and engineering
 Calvin Hooker Goddard (1891–1955), American scientist, "the father of forensic ballistics"
 Cliff Goddard, Australian professor in linguistics
 David R. Goddard (1908–1985), American plant physiologist and scientific administrator, son of Pliny Earle Goddard
 Dick Goddard (1931–2020), meteorologist at WJW-TV in Cleveland
 Ebenezer Goddard, British businessman and engineer
 Ernest James Goddard, Australian professor of biology
 Henry H. Goddard (1866–1957), American psychologist and eugenicist
 Ives Goddard (born 1941), American linguist
 Lisa Goddard (1966–2022), American climatologist
 Michael Goddard, Australian animal genetics researcher
 Peter Goddard (physicist) (born 1945), British mathematical physicist
 Pliny Earle Goddard, early American linguist, father of David R. Goddard
 Robert H. Goddard (1882–1945), "the father of modern US rocketry"
 Stacie E. Goddard, American political scientist
 William Goddard (engineer), IBM engineer
 William Andrew Goddard III, American theoretical chemist

Sports
 Brendon Goddard (born 1985), Australian rules footballer
 Dicky Goddard (1879–1949), English rugby union and rugby league footballer who played in the 1890s and 1900s 
 Hope Goddard Iselin (1868–1970), American sportswoman
 Jamie Goddard (born 1972), Australian rugby league footballer
 Joe Goddard (boxer) (1857–1903), Australian boxer
 John Goddard (cricketer) (1919–1987), Barbadian cricketer
 John Goddard (footballer) (born 1993), English Footballer
 Jordan Goddard (born 1993), English footballer
 Paul Goddard (footballer) (born 1959), English footballer
 Peter Goddard (motorcyclist) (born 1964), Australian motorcycle road racer
 Richard Goddard (footballer) (born 1978), Trinidad and Tobago football goalkeeper
 Richard Goddard (rugby league) (born 1974), English rugby league footballer who played in the 1990s and 2000s 
 Richard Goddard-Crawley (born 1978), British semi-professional association football midfielder
 Spike Goddard (Richard Goddard, born 1992), Australian racing driver
 Tom Goddard (1900–1966), English cricketer; fifth highest first-class wicket-taker
 Tracy Goddard (born 1969), British runner
 Trevor Goddard (cricketer) (1931–2016), South African cricketer
 Trevor Goddard (1962–2003), English actor and former professional boxer

Others
 Goddard family, in the English counties of Wiltshire, Hampshire, and Berkshire, between the Tudor period and the late modern era
 John Goddard (disambiguation), multiple people
 Nichola Goddard (1980–2006), Canadian army captain who was killed during Canadian operations in Afghanistan
 Thomas Goddard (priest) (1674–1731), Canon of Windsor

See also
Goddard (given name)
Godard (surname)

References

English-language surnames